The Sree Narayana Jayanthi Vallam Kali or Boat Race, at Kumarakom, Kerala is held in September every year during Onam festival. More than 1,000 oarsmen in boats of different sizes and shapes participate. Even though snake boats participate in this race, the importance is given here is for iruttukuthi, in which about 50 oarsmen row. The successful iruttukuthi wins the Sree Narayana Ever Rolling Trophy.

Origin 
In 1903 the Sree Narayana Guru arrived at Kumarakom to consecrate an idol of Sri Balasubrahmonia Swami at the Kumarakom. After much hesitation that he agreed to consecrate the idol as he was more interested in starting a school at the backward village. Eventually, both the school and the temple were started as per the wish of the Guru. The arrival of the Guru was a great day of celebration for the people of this nondescript village by the Vembanad lake and they welcomed the sage into their midst, accompanying him in their boats in a procession. To commemorate this event, for the past many decades, a boat race, preceded by a boat procession are held as part of the Sri Narayana Jayanthi celebrations at Kumarakom.

Celebrations 
The day begins with special pujas at the Kumaramangalom Temple. This is followed by Gurupuja and Gurupushpanjali at the Gurumandiram. Arts and sports competitions for children are held as part of the celebrations during the forenoon. The Kumarakom boat race commences. Prior to this, the grand procession of country boats carrying a portrait of Sree Narayana Guru and the thidampu from Kumaramangalom Temple is held up to Kottathodu, the venue of the boat race. The celebrations conclude with a public meeting and distribution of prizes for the winners.

See also 

 Aranmula Uthrattadi Vallamkali
 Champakulam Moolam Boat Race
 Kallada Boat Race
 Kandassankadavu Boat Race
 Nehru Trophy Boat Race
 President's Trophy Boat Race
 Triprayar Boat Race
 Vallam Kali

External links 
 Snake Boat Race

Boat races in Kerala
Narayana Guru
Festivals in Kottayam district
August events 
September events